Gwalior Assembly constituency is one of the 230 Vidhan Sabha (Legislative Assembly) constituencies of Madhya Pradesh state in central India. This constituency came into existence in 1951, as one of the 79 Vidhan Sabha constituencies of the erstwhile Madhya Bharat state.

Overview
Gwalior (constituency number 15) is one of the 6 Vidhan Sabha constituencies located in Gwalior district. This constituency covers the ward numbers 1 to 18 and 30 to 33 of the Gwalior Municipal Corporation.

Gwalior is part of Gwalior Lok Sabha constituency along with seven other Vidhan Sabha segments, namely, Gwalior Rural, Gwalior East, Gwalior South, Bhitarwar and Dabra in this district and Karera and Pohari in Shivpuri district.

Members of Legislative Assembly

See also
 Gwalior

References

Gwalior
Assembly constituencies of Madhya Pradesh